
Gmina Pcim is a rural gmina (administrative district) in Myślenice County, Lesser Poland Voivodeship, in southern Poland.

Villages
The gmina contains the villages of Pcim, Stróża and Trzebunia.

Neighbouring gminas
Gmina Pcim is bordered by the gminas of Budzów, Lubień, Mszana Dolna, Myślenice, Sułkowice, Tokarnia and Wiśniowa.

References
Polish official population figures 2006

Pcim
Myślenice County